Kamal Ahmed (born 7 February 1935) is a Bangladeshi film director and actor. He won the Bangladesh National Film Award for Best Director twice, for the films Lalu Bhulu (1983) and Goriber Bou (1990).

Filmography
 Ujala (1966)
 Parwana (1966)
 Roop Kumari (1968)
 Abanchhita (1969)
 Osru Diye Lekha (1972)
 Angaar (1978)
 Anuraag (1979)
 Bhanga Gora (1981)
 Rajanigandha (1982)
 Lalu Bhulu (1983)
 Awara (1985)
 Ma o Chhele (1985)
 Byathar Daan (1989)
 Goriber Bou (1990)
 Abujh Sontan (1993)
  Raja Babu (1998)

Awards and nominations
National Film Awards

References

Footnotes

Bibliography

External links
 

Living people
Bangladeshi film directors
Bangladeshi screenwriters
Best Director National Film Award (Bangladesh) winners
1935 births